Lagoa do Ouro (Golden Pond) is a city located in the state of Pernambuco, Brazil, located 263 km west from Recife.

History
In early 1902, Captain Amador José Monteiro of the Brazilian National Guard presented a manifesto to the Municipal Council of the municipality Correntes. The council gathered on February 9, 1902, and authorized the first fair of the village. The council also approved of the town's name of Igatauá during this meeting. On December 9, 1938, the name was changed to Lagoa do Ouro due to an urban legend that arose in the village, where nuggets or gold bars were believed to be in a local pond belonging to the estate of João Alves da Silva, who became known as John Gold.

Geography
The municipality contains part of the Pedra Talhada Biological Reserve, a fully protected conservation unit created in 1989.

Climate
Lagoa do Ouro has a tropical savanna climate (Aw) according to the Köppen climate classification.

Economy
The main economic activities in Lagoa do Ouro are based in agribusiness. Beans, manioc, corn and livestock such as cattle, sheep and poultry are the main agricultural resources within the municipality.

Economic indicators

Economy by Sector (2006)

Health indicators

References

Municipalities in Pernambuco